D'Angelo Julius Skyler Ross (born October 29, 1996) is an American football cornerback for the Houston Texans of the National Football League (NFL). He played college football at New Mexico.

College career

Fullerton College 
Ross attended his first two years of college at Fullerton before transferring to New Mexico. In 25 career games at Fullerton, Ross had 8 interceptions and was named first-team All-SCFA National Division during his sophomore season.

New Mexico 
Ross played the final two seasons of his college career at the University of New Mexico, appearing in 24 games. In his junior campaign, Ross had 28 total tackles and 11 pass deflections. In his senior season, he improved to 57 total tackles with 6 pass deflections, 1 interception and 1 forced fumble. Ross was not invited to the NFL Scouting Combine, but posted an impressive 4.32 second 40 yard dash at New Mexico's pro day.

Professional career

New England Patriots
Ross was signed by the New England Patriots as an undrafted free agent on May 2, 2019. He was placed on injured reserve on August 12, 2019. On September 5, 2020, Ross was waived by the team and signed to the practice squad the next day. He was elevated to the active roster on January 2, 2021, for the team's week 17 game against the New York Jets, and reverted to the practice squad after the game. He signed a reserve/future contract on January 4, 2021.

On August 31, 2021, Ross was waived by the Patriots and re-signed to the practice squad.

Miami Dolphins
On January 25, 2022, Ross signed a reserve/future contract with the Miami Dolphins. He was waived/injured on August 29, 2022 and placed on injured reserve. He was released on September 1.

Houston Texans
On November 22, 2022, Ross was signed to the Houston Texans practice squad. He signed a reserve/future contract on January 10, 2023.

Personal life
Ross was born to Daniel and Wendy Ross and is one of five children. Ross graduated with a degree in business administration in December 2018 from the University of New Mexico.

References

External links
New Mexico Lobos football bio

1996 births
Living people
American football cornerbacks
New Mexico Lobos football players
People from La Puente, California
Players of American football from California
Sportspeople from Los Angeles County, California
New England Patriots players
Miami Dolphins players
Houston Texans players